In the House may refer to:

 In the House (film), a 2012 French film directed by François Ozon
 In the House (TV series), an American sitcom that ran 1995–1999
 In the House, a British TV sitcom featuring the girl group Cleopatra
 "In the House" (song), by Crowder, 2021
 "In the House", song performed by Scott Krippayne and Felicia Barton for 101 Dalmatian Street soundtrack
 In the House, 1985 album by Images in Vogue